CHAdeMO is a fast-charging system for battery electric vehicles, developed in 2010 by the CHAdeMO Association, formed by the Tokyo Electric Power Company and five major Japanese automakers. The name is an abbreviation of "CHArge de MOve" (which the organization translates as "charge for moving") and is derived from the Japanese phrase "", translating to English as "How about a cup of tea?", referring to the time it would take to charge a car.

It competes with the Combined Charging System (CCS), which since 2014 has been required on electric vehicles sold in the European Union, Tesla's proprietary connector used by its Supercharger network outside of Europe, and China's GB/T charging standard.

, CHAdeMO remains popular in Japan, but is being equipped on very few new cars sold in North America or Europe.

It has been included in several international vehicle charging standards.

The second-generation specification allows for up to 400 kW by 1 kV, 400 A direct current. The CHAdeMO Association is currently co-developing with China Electricity Council (CEC) the third-generation standard with the working name of “ChaoJi” that aims to deliver 900 kW.

History 

CHAdeMO originated out of a charging system design from the Tokyo Electric Power Company (TEPCO). TEPCO had been participating on numerous EV infrastructure trial projects between 2006 and 2009 in collaboration with Nissan, Mitsubishi, Fuji Heavy Industries (now Subaru), and other manufacturers. These trials resulted in TEPCO developing patented technology and a specification, which would form the basis for the CHAdeMO.

The first commercial CHAdeMO charging infrastructure was commissioned in 2009 alongside the launch of the Mitsubishi i-MiEV.

In March 2010, TEPCO formed the CHAdeMO Association with Toyota along with earlier partners Nissan, Mitsubishi, and Subaru. They were later joined by Hitachi, Honda and Panasonic. CHAdeMO would be the first organization to propose a standardized DC fast charge system  to be shared across diverse EVs, regardless of their brands and models.

CHAdeMO became a published international standard in 2014 when the International Electrotechnical Commission (IEC) adopted IEC 61851-23 for the charging system, IEC 61851-24 for communication, and IEC 62196-3 configuration AA for the connector. Later that year, the European Committee for Electrotechnical Standardization (EN) added CHAdeMO as a published standard, followed by the Institute of Electrical and Electronics Engineers (IEEE) in 2016.

A major blow to the international adoption of CHAdeMO came in 2013 when European Commission designated the Combined Charging System (CCS) Combo 2 as the mandated plug for DC high-power charging in Europe. While the European Parliament had contemplated removing all CHAdeMO infrastructure by January 2019, the final mandate only required that all publicly accessible chargers in the EU be equipped with CCS Combo 2, allowing stations to offer multiple connector types.

While CHAdeMO was the first fast-charging standard to see widespread deployment and remains widely equipped on vehicles sold in Japan, it has been losing market share in other countries. Honda was the first of the CHAdeMO Association members to stop equipping the connector on vehicles sold outside of Japan starting with the Clarity Electric in 2016. Nissan also abandoned CHAdeMO on its Ariya SUV introduced in 2021. Toyota and Subaru have also equipped their jointly developed bZ4X/Solterra with the CCS connector outside of Japan. , the Mitsubishi Outlander PHEV and Nissan Leaf are the only plug-in vehicles equipped with CHAdeMO for sale in North America.

Connector design

DC fast charge 
Most electric vehicles (EV) have an on-board charger that uses a rectifier circuit to transform alternating current (AC) from the electrical grid to direct current (DC) suitable for recharging the EV's battery pack. Most EVs are designed with limited AC input power, typically based on the available power of consumer outlets: for example, 240 V, 30 A in the United States and Japan; 240 V, 40 A in Canada; and 230 V, 15 A or 3Φ, 400 V, 32 A in Europe and Australia. AC chargers with higher limits have been specified, for example SAE J1772-2009 has an option for 240 V, 80 A and VDE-AR-E 2623-2-2 has a 3Φ, 400 V, 63 A. But these charger types have been rarely deployed.

Cost and thermal issues limit how much power the rectifier can handle, so beyond approximately 240 V AC and 75 A it is better for an external charging station to deliver DC directly to the battery. For faster charging, dedicated DC chargers can be built in permanent locations and provided with high-current connections to the grid. Such high voltage and high-current charging is called a DC fast charge (DCFC) or DC quick charging (DCQC).

Connector protocols and history 
While the charging system design for CHAdeMO came out of TEPCOs trials starting in 2006, the connector itself had been designed in 1993, and was specified by the 1993 Japan Electric Vehicle Standard (JEVS) G105-1993 from the JARI.

In addition to carrying power, the connector also makes a data connection using the CAN bus protocol. This performs functions such as a safety interlock to avoid energizing the connector before it is safe (similar to SAE J1772), transmitting battery parameters to the charging station including when to stop charging (top battery percentage, usually 80%), target voltage, total battery capacity, and how the station should vary its output current while charging.

The first protocol issued was CHAdeMO 0.9, which offered maximum charging power of 62.5 kW (125 A × 500 V DC). Version 1.0 followed in 2012, enhancing vehicle protection, compatibility, and reliability. Version 1.1 (2015) allowed the current to dynamically change during charging; Version 1.2 (2017) increased maximum power to 200 kW (400 A × 500 V DC).

CHAdeMO published its protocol for 400 kW (400 A × 1 kV) 'ultra-fast' charging in May 2018 as CHAdeMO 2.0. CHAdeMO 2.0 allowed the standard to better compete with the CCS 'ultra-fast' stations being built around the world as part of new networks such as IONITY charging consortium.

Vehicle-to-grid (V2G) 
In 2014, CHAdeMO published its protocol for vehicle-to-grid (V2G) integration, which also includes applications for vehicle to load (V2L) or vehicle to home-off grid (V2H), collectively denoted V2X. The technology enables EV owners to use the car as an energy storage device, potentially lowering costs by optimising energy usage for the current time of use pricing and providing electricity to the grid. Since 2012, multiple V2X demo projects using the CHAdeMO protocol have been demonstrated worldwide. Some of the recent projects include UCSD INVENT in the United States, as well as Sciurus and e4Future in the United Kingdom that are supported by Innovate UK.

CHAdeMO 3.0: ChaoJi 

In August 2018, CHAdeMO Association announced they were co-developing the next-generation ultra-high-power protocol, named CHAdeMO 3.0, with China Electricity Council (CEC), which would harmonise the CHAdeMO standard with the CEC GB/T charging standard 20234.3-2015. This project includes a new connector with the code name ChaoJi, and plans to increase charging rate to 900 kW (600 A x 1.5 kV), all the while ensuring backward compatibility with the current CHAdeMO and GB/T 20234.3 (IEC 62916-3 configuration BB) DC chargers, according to the Association. It was revealed that ChaoJi can also be made backward compatible with CCS and such study is under consideration as of summer 2019. The ChaoJi connector could also take the place of the DC connector of CCS Combo 2.

By adopting liquid cooling within the cable and moving the locking mechanism from the connector to the vehicle, the ChaoJi connector is significantly lighter and more compact than the prior CHAdeMO design. IEC 68151-1 prohibits the use of adapters for high power charging; an amendment was submitted by the ChaoJi alliance to allow the use of adapters. A prototype adapter was built by Fujikura, but it was inflexible and heavy at nearly  because the cable did not use internal cooling.

Deployment

Charging stations 
CHAdeMO-type fast charging stations were initially installed in great numbers by TEPCO in Japan, which required the creation of an additional power distribution network to supply these stations.

Since then, CHAdeMO charger installation has expanded its geographical reach and in January 2022, the CHAdeMO Association stated that there were 44,900 CHAdeMO chargers installed in 96 countries. These included 7,700 charging stations in Japan, 22,500 in Europe, 8,000 in North America, and 1,000 elsewhere. For the historic evolution of CHAdeMO installation, see above under History.

As of January 2022, a total of 260 certified CHAdeMO charger models have been produced by 50 companies.

In vehicles 

Models supporting CHAdeMO charging include:

 Bollinger B1
 BMW i3 (Japan only)
 Citroën C-ZERO
 Citroën Berlingo Electric/E-Berlingo Multispace (until 2020)
 ENERGICA MY2021
 GLM Tommykaira ZZ EV
 Honda Clarity PHEV (Japan only)
 Honda Fit EV
 Hyundai Ioniq Electric (2016)
 Jaguar i-Pace (Japan only)
 Kia Soul EV (for American and European market until 2019)
 LEVC TX
 Lexus UX 300e (for Europe)
 Mazda Demio EV
 Mitsubishi Fuso eCanter
 Mitsubishi i MiEV
 Mitsubishi MiEV truck
 Mitsubishi Minicab MiEV
 Mitsubishi Outlander PHEV
 Mitsubishi Eclipse Cross PHEV
 Nissan LEAF
 Nissan e-NV200
 Peugeot e-2008
 Peugeot iOn
 Peugeot Partner EV
 Peugeot Partner Tepee
 Subaru Stella EV
 Tesla Model 3, S, X and Y (North American, Korean, and Japanese models via adapter,)
 Tesla Model S, and X (Models with European charge port via adapter, prior to models with integrated CCS 2 capability)
 Toyota eQ
 Toyota Prius PHV (Japan only)
 XPeng G3 (Europe 2020)
 Zero Motorcycles (via optional inlet)
 Vectrix VX-1 Maxi Scooter (via optional inlet)

Gallery

See also 

 CCS Combo
 SAE J1772 (Type 1)
 ChaoJi
 GB/T charging standard

References

External links 
 

International Electrotechnical Commission
DC power connectors
Plug-in hybrid vehicle industry
Charging stations
Automotive standards
2010 establishments in Japan